Pedro Sousa was the defending champion but chose not to defend his title.

Marcelo Tomás Barrios Vera won the title after defeating Juan Manuel Cerúndolo 7–6(9–7), 6–3 in the final.

Seeds

Draw

Finals

Top half

Bottom half

References

External links
Main draw
Qualifying draw

Meerbusch Challenger - 1
2021 Singles